This is a list of star systems within 20–25 light years of Earth. So far, 84 such objects have been found, of which only 7 are bright enough to be visible without a telescope.

See also
 List of nearest stars and brown dwarfs
 List of star systems within 25–30 light-years
 Lists of stars
 List of nearest bright stars

References

star systems within 20-25 light-years
Star systems
star systems within 20-25 light-years